The Raven Society is an honor society at the University of Virginia, founded in 1904 by University student William McCully James, and named in honor of the famous poem by Edgar Allan Poe, who attended UVa in 1826. According to its constitution, one of the Raven Society's main goals is "to bring together the best men in the various departments of the university for mutual acquaintance and for cooperation in their efforts to protect the honor and dignity of the university."

In addition to presenting annual Raven Fellowships, the society recognizes students, professors, administrators, and alumni for their "scholarly pursuits and their dedication to University ideals" with the Raven Award; the Award presentation had its beginning in 1933. The Society is also responsible for the upkeep of Poe's living quarters on campus, at 13 West Range.

The Raven Society has been active in commemorating Poe's life, beginning with a celebration of his centenary in 1909. At this time, the Society first opened Poe's preserved room at 13 West Range, which they had furnished with "a settee from the Allan home in Richmond" as well as "a real raven, stuffed, [which] looked down from a coign of
the room." The Raven Society also celebrated Poe's bicentenary in 2009 by laying three roses and a drink of cognac in 13 West Range.

Notable members of the Raven Society have included founder and UVa Law professor Raleigh C. Minor, University president Frank Hereford, former Alumni Association directors J. Malcolm "Mack" Luck and Gilbert J. Sullivan, University professors Bascom S. Deaver and Ernest Mead, and UVa and Baltimore Colts football player Gary Cuozzo.

Raven Award recipients

By year awarded
 1933 - (premier award) John Lloyd Newcomb, President UVa  
 1934 - Fenton Allen Gentry 
 1935 - Harry Clemons, UVa librarian 
 1936 - Carrington Harrison, M.D. (1912-1974), 1936 Class President UVa
 1937 - Mortimer M. Caplin
 1940 - Mr. Yuille Holt, Jr.
 1941 - William C. Battle
 1942 - Henry L. Kinnier
 1945 - FitzGerald Bemiss
 1977 - David Webb, SFW Capital Partners, Vice Chairman Merrill Lynch
 1979 - John Macfarlane III, Tudor Investment Corporation
 1979 - Peter Kiernan, Chairman/CEO Reeve Foundation
 1986 - Dean Patricia Lampkin
 1997 - Bill Crutchfield, Crutchfield Corporation
 2007 - Dr. Nicole Hurd, CEO College Advising Corps; President Lafayette College
 2017 - John Strangfeld, Chairman/CEO Prudential Financial

Others
 Edward L. Ayers, former Arts & Sciences dean at UVa, and University of Richmond president
 R. David Banyard, CEO Myers Industries
 David Carr, former President, Virginia Athletics Foundation, Thomas Jefferson Society, and UVa Alumni Association
 Colgate Darden, UVa president
 Teresa Reynolds DiMarco, Chairman UVa Board of Trustees
 William H. Fishback
 Dr. Annette Gibbs
 Dr. Howard Kutchai, Dept of Physiology
 Paul M. Leggett, Managing Director, Mithril Capital Management LLC
Dr. Jeffrey Lenowitz, Brandeis University Professor
 Dr. Stewart D. Roberson

References

External links
 The Raven Society

1904 establishments in Virginia
Honor societies
University of Virginia
Virginia culture